Westham Station in Henrico County, Virginia, USA, was originally located at Westham on the Richmond and Allegheny Railroad (R&A), which was laid along the towpath of the James River and Kanawha Canal in the 1880s.  The R&A railroad was acquired by the Chesapeake and Ohio Railway (C&O) in the 1890s. Westham Station was built in 1911, near the Westham Bridge, which spans the James River. The station was heated by a coal stove and had a telegraph for communication through the 1950s.

C&O's Westham Station was relocated to a Richmond city park on the intersection of Robin Hood Rd and Hermitage Rd in 1961.

References

Buildings and structures in Henrico County, Virginia
Railway stations in Virginia
Transportation in Richmond, Virginia
Stations along Chesapeake and Ohio Railway lines